Michel Strogoff is a 1926 French silent historical adventure film directed by Viktor Tourjansky and starring Ivan Mozzhukhin, Nathalie Kovanko and Acho Chakatouny. It is an adaptation of Jules Verne's 1876 novel Michael Strogoff.

Production
A number of filmmakers involved were exiles from the Russian Revolution of 1917. The film's art direction was by Eduardo Gosch, César Lacca, Alexandre Lochakoff, Vladimir Meingard and Pierre Schild who recreated the atmosphere of the mid-nineteenth century Russian Empire.

Cast
 Ivan Mozzhukhin as Michael Strogoff  
 Nathalie Kovanko as Nadia Fedor  
 Acho Chakatouny as Ivan Ogareff  
 Jeanne Brindeau as Maria Strogoff  
 Marie-Louise Vois as Zaugara  
 M. Debas as Enur Feifar  
 Vladimir Gajdarov as Tzar Alexandre of Russia  
 Micolas Kougoucheff as General Kissoff  
 Henri Debain as Harry Blount 
 Boris de Fast as Féofar-Khan  
 Gabriel de Gravone as Alcide Jolivet  
 Vladimir Kvanin as Wassili Feodoroff, Nadia's father 
 Nicolas Koline

References

Bibliography
 Bryony Dixon. 100 Silent Films. Palgrave Macmillan, 2011.

External links 

 

1926 films
1920s historical adventure films
French historical adventure films
French silent feature films
1920s French-language films
Films based on Michael Strogoff
Films directed by Victor Tourjansky
Films set in Russia
Films set in the 19th century
French black-and-white films
Silent films in color
Silent historical adventure films
1920s French films